Events from the year 1414 in France

Incumbents
 Monarch – Charles VI

Events

Births
 11 May – Francis I, Duke of Brittany (died 1450)
 Unknown – Charles I, Count of Nevers (died 1466)

Deaths
 28 April – Jeanne-Marie de Maille (born 1331)

References

References

1410s in France